Antimargarita dulcis is a species of sea snail, a marine gastropod mollusk in the family Margaritidae.

Description
The shell size varies between 9 mm and 15 mm

Distribution
This species occurs in Antarctic waters off the South Shetland Islands, the Antarctic Peninsula, the Weddell Sea and the Ross Sea.

References

 Aldea C., Zelaya D.G. & Troncoso J.S. (2009) Two new trochids of the genus Antimargarita (Gastropoda: Vetigastropoda: Trochidae) from the Bellingshausen Sea and South Shetland Islands, Antarctica. Polar Biology 32:417–426
 Engl W. (2012) Shells of Antarctica. Hackenheim: Conchbooks. 402 pp

External links
 

dulcis
Gastropods described in 1907